Ageratina sodiroi is a species of flowering plant in the family Asteraceae. It is endemic to Ecuador, where it is widely distributed in the Andes.

This plant grows as an herb, subshrub, or shrub. It grows in forests and upper Andean vegetation types up to 3500 meters in altitude.

Etymology
Ageratina is derived from Greek meaning 'un-aging', in reference to the flowers keeping their color for a long time. This name was used by Dioscorides for a number of different plants.

References

sodiroi
Endemic flora of Ecuador
Plants described in 1900
Taxonomy articles created by Polbot